The Paterno is a Manhattan apartment building located at 116th Street and Riverside Drive and also known as 440 Riverside Drive. The building is noted for its curved facade, impressive marble lobby with a stained-glass ceiling, and substantial porte-cochère. Across 116th Street, The Paterno faces the Colosseum, another building with a similar curved facade. The New York Times has said that the "opposing curves, (form) a gateway as impressive as any publicly built arch or plaza in New York.

The Paterno and Colosseum were both developed by Charles V. Paterno and designed by the architectural firm of Schwartz & Gross.

The Paterno has been featured in the films Enchanted and Enemies, a Love Story.

References

External links

Apartment buildings in New York City
Residential buildings in Manhattan
Upper West Side
Morningside Heights, Manhattan